Janel Curry is a geographer, educator, and visionary leader originally from Canton, Illinois.

Career
Curry graduated from Bethel College (now Bethel University) in 1977 with high honors, earning a B.A. in political science. She then earned an M.A. and Ph.D. in geography from the University of Minnesota. Curry began her career in 1985 at Central College (Iowa) where she taught geography. She moved to Calvin College in 1996 and taught full-time until 2000 when she transitioned to an administrative position as the Dean of Research and Scholarship. She then served as Provost at Gordon College in Massachusetts and Interim Vice President for Academic Affairs at Medaille College in Buffalo, NY.  
  
Curry has authored more than 40 peer-reviewed articles, 20 book chapters, and 4 books.  Her research has ranged from the exploration of human-land relations, institutional health and resilience, and theological perspectives on nature to women in leadership and higher education in a global context.

Much of Janel Curry's published research, essays and blog posts can be found through her website at https://www.janelcurry.com.

Honors
Curry has been awarded three Fulbright scholarships over her career including a research Fulbright to the University of Guelph, Ontario, an appointment to work on general education at City University of Hong Kong, and a Fulbright Specialist award to assist Forman Christian College, A Chartered University, in Lahore, Pakistan.  While at Calvin College, she held the Spoelhof Chair in her first year and later was appointed to the Gary and Henrietta Byker Chair in Christian Perspectives on Political, Social, and Economic Thought from 2008 to 2012.

Other awards include:
 John Fraser Hart Award for Research Excellence
 Lifetime Achievement Award for Excellence in Rural and Agricultural Geography
 Decade Alumni Award for Academic Achievement (from Bethel University)
 Michigan Campus Compact Faculty/Staff Community Service-Learning Award

References

American geographers
Year of birth missing (living people)
Living people
People from Canton, Illinois
University of Minnesota College of Liberal Arts alumni
Bethel University (Minnesota) alumni
Central College (Iowa) faculty
Calvin University faculty
Women geographers